The department of Allier has, since 1 January 2017, had eleven public establishments for intercommunal cooperation (EPCI) with their own tax system: three communautés d'agglomération and eight communautés de communes.

Until 2016, the department had twenty-one intercommunal structures (three communautés d'agglomération and eighteen communautés de communes).

The 320 communes (318 in 2016 and 317 since 2017) of the department are part of a communautés d'agglomération/de communes of Allier or one of its neighbouring departments.

List of intercommunalities in 2019 

With the exception of the communauté de communes du Bocage Bourbonnais, subject to additional taxation, all of Allier's intercommunal governments apply a single professional tax.

By prefectural decree of 8 December 2017, the commune of Saint-Point was moved from the communauté de communes Saint-Pourçain Sioule Limagne to the agglomerated community of Vichy Communauté.

References 

Intercommunalities of Allier
Allier